The Minister for Higher Education and Further Education, Youth Employment and Training is a Junior ministerial post in the Education Department of the Scottish Government. As a result, the Minister does not attend the Scottish Cabinet. The post was created in May 2007 after the appointment of the Scottish National Party minority administration and the Minister reports to the Cabinet Secretary for Education and Skills, who has overall responsibility for the portfolio, and is a member of cabinet. The Minister has specific responsibility for further education and colleges, higher education and universities, science and STEM (science, technology, engineering and mathematics, student funding, youth work, and widening access to education.

The post is one of two reporting to the Cabinet Secretary for Education and Skills, alongside the Minister for Children and Young People.

Minister

History
The responsibilities of the junior ministerial reporting to the Education Secretary have changed considerably over time.  The post was originally focused on schools: from 1999 to 2000, responsibility for schools rested with the Minister for Children and Education, which became the Minister for Education, Europe and External Affairs in the McLeish Government of 2000 to 2001. From 2001 to 2007, the schools portfolio rested with the Minister for Education and Young People. The skills brief also rested with the Minister for Enterprise and Lifelong Learning between 1999 and 2007.

The Salmond government, elected following the 2007 Scottish Parliament election, created the junior post of the Minister for Schools and Skills who assisted the Cabinet Secretary for Education and Lifelong Learning, in the Scottish Executive Education Department.  This was then retitled on 7 December 2011 following the creation of the Minister of Youth Employment post which took over the responsibility for skills and training. A further change occurred in May 2016, following Nicola Sturgeon's reshuffle. The post was rebranded as Minister for Further Education, Higher Education and Science.

The post was vacant for a period over as the summer of 2018, as First Minister Nicola Sturgeon's original choice, Gillian Martin, was revealed to have posted comments of a transphobic nature in a blog in 2007. Ms Martin's name was omitted from the list of appointments to be approved by Parliament on 28 June 2018 following a reshuffle. Richard Lochhead was later appointed to the role. Following the formation of the Third Sturgeon Government, the post was once more retitled to Minister for Higher Education and Further Education, Youth Employment and Training.

See also
Scottish Parliament
Question Time
Scottish Government

References

External links 
Cabinet and Ministers on Scottish Government website
Minister for Further Education, Higher Education and Science on Scottish Government website

Education in Scotland
Further Education, Higher Education and Science
Languages of Scotland
Science and technology in Scotland
Science ministers